Kim Tae-Woo (Hangul: 김태우, Hanja: 金泰雨; born March 7, 1962, in Gimje, Jeollabuk-do) is a retired South Korean freestyle wrestler, four-time Olympian and Olympic Bronze  Medalist. Kim represented South Korea for 15 years in freestyle wrestling and is considered the greatest South Korean heavyweight wrestler of all time.

Career

Kim received significant international attention at the 1988 Summer Olympics where he won the bronze medal in the freestyle 90 kg class.

Kim won two consecutive gold medals in the freestyle wrestling 100 kg class at the Asian Games (1990 and 1994).
However, Kim was given a nickname unlucky fourth place player, finishing in fourth place at the 1991 World Wrestling Championships,  1992 Summer Olympics, 1993 World Wrestling Championships and 1996 Asian Wrestling Championships.

Kim officially retired from competitive wrestling after the 1996 Summer Olympics and began his coach career. He was named the head coach of the South Korean national freestyle wrestling team for the 2000 Summer Olympics and 2002 Asian Games.

Kim currently lives in Dallas, Texas, running his own business.

External links
Kim Tae-Woo's profile from sports-references

1962 births
Living people
South Korean wrestlers
Olympic wrestlers of South Korea
Wrestlers at the 1984 Summer Olympics
Wrestlers at the 1988 Summer Olympics
Wrestlers at the 1992 Summer Olympics
Wrestlers at the 1996 Summer Olympics
South Korean male sport wrestlers
Olympic bronze medalists for South Korea
Olympic medalists in wrestling
Asian Games medalists in wrestling
Wrestlers at the 1990 Asian Games
Wrestlers at the 1994 Asian Games
Medalists at the 1988 Summer Olympics
Asian Games gold medalists for South Korea
Medalists at the 1990 Asian Games
Medalists at the 1994 Asian Games
People from Gimje
Sportspeople from North Jeolla Province
20th-century South Korean people
21st-century South Korean people